Lu Yen-hsun was the defending champion.
Peter Gojowczyk won the title, defeating Suk-Young Jeong 6–3, 6–1 in the final.

Seeds

Draw

Finals

Top half

Bottom half

References
 Main Draw
 Qualifying Draw

Ningbo Challenger - Singles
2012 Singles